Zhaleo Rio is a Nationalist Democratic Progressive Party  politician from Nagaland. He has been elected in Nagaland Legislative Assembly election from Ghaspani II Assembly constituency in 2013 as a candidate of  Naga People's Front and 2018 as a candidate of Nationalist Democratic Progressive Party. He was deputy speaker of Nagaland Legislative Assembly from 2018 to 2019 before being named as an advisor to Chief Minister of Nagaland Neiphiu Rio and allocated three departments, they are Sericulture, Excise and Minority Affairs. He is brother of Chief Minister of Nagaland Neiphiu Rio.

References 

Living people
Naga People's Front politicians
Nationalist Democratic Progressive Party politicians
Nagaland MLAs 2018–2023
Nagaland MLAs 2013–2018
Year of birth missing (living people)
People from Kohima
Deputy Speakers of the Nagaland Legislative Assembly